Ennio Candotti (born 1942 in Rome, Italy) is a Brazilian physicist and scientific leader.

He studied physics at the University of São Paulo, in São Paulo, from 1960 to 1964, and also at the University of Naples, in Naples, Italy (1970–71). From 1966 to 1968 he specialized in theoretical physics at the University of Pisa (relativity theory), in mathematical physics at the University of Munich, in Munich, Germany (1968–1969) and in dynamic systems at the University of Naples again.

From 1974 to 1995, Candotti was a professor with the Federal University of Rio de Janeiro. Currently he is a professor at the Universidade Federal do Espírito Santo, in Vitória, state of Espírito Santo. He was naturalized a Brazilian in 1983.

Dr. Candotti is in his fourth mandate as the president of the Brazilian Society for the Progress of Science (Sociedade Brasileira para o Progresso da Ciência), the major scientific association in the country, and editor of Ciência Hoje, its scientific popularization magazine. For his activities in this area he has received the 1999 Kalinga Prize conceded by UNESCO. He was also the president of the International Union for Science Communicators, created in 2002 in Mumbai, India.

Bibliography
CANDOTTI, E. ; COCHO, G. ; MONTEMAYOR, R. . Thermal Gohost fields and unstable systems. Nuovo Cimento Della Societa Italiana di Fisica B - General Physics, Bologna, v. 106B, p. 13-22, 1990.
CANDOTTI, E. ; PALMIERI, C. ; VITALE, B. . Universal Noether's nature of infinitesimal transformations in Lorentz covariant field theories. Il Nuovo Cimento, Bologna, v. 7A, p. 271-279, 1972.
CANDOTTI, E. ; PALMIERI, C. ; VITALE, B. . On the inversion of Noether theorem in classical dynamical systems. American Journal of Physics, USA, v. 40.3, p. 424-427, 1972.
CANDOTTI, E. ; PALMIERI, C. ; VITALE, B. . On the inversion of Noether Theorem in Lagrangian Formalism. Il Nuovo Cimento, Bologna, v. 70, p. 233-239, 1970.

External links
 Ennio Candotti's Curriculum Vitae. CNPq Lattes System (In Portuguese).
 Interviews with Ennio Candotti at the Universia Brasil site: 2003 and 2005 (In Portuguese)
 Creación de Ciencia Hoy:
 

1942 births
Living people
20th-century Brazilian physicists
Brazilian science writers
University of São Paulo alumni
20th-century Italian physicists
Brazilian people of Italian descent
Kalinga Prize recipients
Academic staff of the Federal University of Rio de Janeiro
Expatriate academics in Brazil
21st-century Brazilian scientists